Port Saxon is a community in the Canadian province of Nova Scotia, located in the Shelburne municipal district of Shelburne County.

See also
 List of communities in Nova Scotia

References

External links
Port Saxon on Destination Nova Scotia

Communities in Shelburne County, Nova Scotia
General Service Areas in Nova Scotia